This is a list of Pakistani films released in 2019.

Highest grossing films

The top films released in 2019 by worldwide gross are as follows:

Background color  indicates the current releases

Events

Award ceremonies

Releases

January – April

May - August

September – December

References

2019
Lists of 2019 films by country or language
Films